

Buildings and structures

Buildings
 1240 – Construction begins of the Castel del Monte in Apulia, Italy, for Frederick II, Holy Roman Emperor; used by Frederick primarily as a hunting lodge.
 1242 – Heddal Stave Church in Norway consecrated, built in the first half of the 13th century.
 1242 – Rebuilding of Peyrepertuse Castle in France to its current form begun.
 c.1245 – Rebuilding of Westminster Abbey begun.
 1246 – Lakshmi Narasimha Temple, Nuggehalli built in the Hoysala Empire.
 1247
 Basilica of St. Cunibert, Cologne, consecrated.
 Inauguration of St. Mary's Church, Sigtuna, Sweden.
 Start of reconstruction of Bassac Abbey.
 Approximate start of construction of original Pagoda of Monk Wansong in Beijing.
 1248
 April 26 – Consecration of Sainte Chapelle, Paris.
 August 15 – The foundation stone of Cologne Cathedral in Cologne is laid by Archbishop Konrad von Hochstaden.
 1249 – Sadasiva Temple, Nuggehalli built in the Hoysala Empire.

Births

Deaths
 1245 – c. June: Elias of Dereham, English canon and building designer

References

Architecture
Indian architectural history